Lauren Beukes (born 5 June 1976) is a South African novelist, short story writer, journalist and television scriptwriter.

Early life
Lauren Beukes was born 5 June 1976. She grew up in Johannesburg, South Africa. She attended Roedean School in Johannesburg, and has an MA in creative writing from the University of Cape Town. She worked as a freelance journalist for ten years, including two years in New York and Chicago.

Career

Books 
She is the author of The Shining Girls, a novel about a time-traveling serial killer and the survivor who turns the hunt around. It was published on 15 April 2013 by the Umuzi imprint of Random House Struik in South Africa, on 25 April 2013 by HarperCollins in the United Kingdom, and on 4 June 2013 by Mulholland Books in the United States. HarperCollins had won the international rights to the book in a fierce bidding war with several other publishers.

The Shining Girls won The Strand Magazine Critic's Best Novel Award, the RT Thriller of the Year, Exclusive Books' Readers Choice Award, and South Africa's most prestigious literary award, the University of Johannesburg Prize. The TV rights for the novel have been acquired by MRC and Leonardo DiCaprio's Appian Way according to The Hollywood Reporter.

Her previous novel, Zoo City, a hardboiled thriller about crime, magic, the music industry, refugees and redemption set in a re-imagined Johannesburg won the 2011 Arthur C. Clarke Award, and the 2010 Kitschies Red Tentacle for best novel. It was short-listed for the 2010 BSFA Award for best novel, the 2011 World Fantasy award for best novel, the 2010–2011 University of Johannesburg Creative Writing Prize, the M-Net Literary Awards, the Nielsen's Booksellers' Choice Award 2011 and long-listed for South Africa's Sunday Times Fiction Prize 2011 and the 2012 International Dublin Literary Award. The cover artwork received the 2010 BSFA award for best art. The novel has also been short-listed for the Grand Prix de l'Imaginaire in France for best foreign novel, best translation by Laurent Philibert-Caillat and best cover by Joey Hi-Fi.

The film rights have been optioned by South African producer, Helena Spring.

Her first novel was Moxyland, a cyberpunk novel set in a future Cape Town. Both books were first published in South Africa by Jacana Publishing and released internationally by Osprey Publishing's Angry Robot imprint.

Her first book, the non-fiction Maverick: Extraordinary Women from South Africa's Past (Oshun 2004) was long-listed for the 2006 Sunday Times Alan Paton Award.

She has published short stories in several anthologies including "Further Conflicts" (NewCon Press 2011), Home Away (Zebra 2010), Touch: Stories of Contact (Zebra 2009), Open: Erotic Stories from South African Women Writers (Oshun 2008), FAB (Umuzi 2007), African Road: New Writing from Southern Africa (New Africa Books 2005), 180 Degrees: New Fiction by South African Women Writers (Oshun 2006), and Urban 03 (New Africa Books 2005).

In July 2014, Beukes published a new novel called Broken Monsters, which is set in Detroit, Michigan.

Her first short fiction collection, Slipping: Stories, Essays, and Other Writing (Tachyon Publications), was released in October 2016.

Film and television 
As head writer for Clockwork Zoo, she was part of the development team that created South Africa's first half-hour animated TV series, URBO: The Adventures of Pax Afrika. She also wrote 12 episodes of the Playhouse Disney show, Florrie's Dragons for Wish Films and episodes of the animated series Mouk for French production company Millimages.

She directed a feature-length documentary on Miss Gay Western Cape called Glitterboys & Ganglands. The film has shown at various festivals including the Atlanta Film Festival, Encounters, Out in Africa and won best LGBT film at the San Diego Black Film Festival.

She was also one of the writers, together with Ben Trovato and Tumiso Tsukudu on the pilot of controversial ZA News, a Spitting Image-style satire show with puppets based on the work of South African cartoonist, Zapiro. The pilot was commissioned by the SABC but never broadcast.

Her novel, The Shining Girls, was adapted into a television series, Shining Girls by MRC and Appian Way Productions. It premiered on Apple TV+ on 29 April 2022.

Journalism 
As a journalist, her articles have been published in a wide range of local and international magazines including The Hollywood Reporter, Nature Medicine and Colors as well as The Sunday Times Lifestyle, Marie Claire, Elle, Cosmopolitan and SL Magazine.

She won "Best Columnist Western Cape" in the Vodacom Journalist of the Year Awards in 2007 and 2008.

Comics 
Beukes made her comics writing debut with "All The Pretty Ponies" in Vertigo's Strange Adventures one-shot. She also wrote "The Hidden Kingdom", an arc of Fairest (issues #8–13), a spin-off of Bill Willingham's Eisner Award-winning Fables series, and a Durham Red story for 2000 AD'''s 40th anniversary special issue.
Her series Survivors' Club, illustrated by Dale Halvorsen and Ryan Kelly  was published by Vertigo October 2015 – June 2016 for nine issues. Before its cancellation the series was under development as a TV series.

Bibliography
 Maverick: Extraordinary Women from South Africa's Past (2004)
 Moxyland (2008)
 Zoo City (2010)
 The Shining Girls (2013)
 Broken Monsters (2014)
 Slipping (short story collection, 2016)
 Afterland (2020) - Originally titled MotherlandShort fiction
Beukes has published short fiction in various collections:
 Urban '03 (2004)
 African Road: New Writing from South Africa (2005)
 180 Degrees: New Fiction by South African Women Writers (2006)
 FAB (2007)
 Open: Erotic Stories from South African Women Writers (2008)
 Touch: Stories of Contact (2009)
 Home Away: 24 Hours, 24 Cities, 24 Authors (2010)
 Pandemonium: Stories of the Apocalypse (2011)

Other
 Foreword for Jeff Noon – Vurt, 20th anniversary edition (2013)
Foreword for Alan Moore – The Ballad of Halo Jones'' (2013)

References

External links

 
 
 
 
 
 Interview with the Mail & Guardian
 FAQ from the author's website

1976 births
Living people
21st-century journalists
21st-century short story writers
21st-century South African novelists
21st-century South African women writers
Afrofuturist writers
Alumni of Roedean School, South Africa
People from Johannesburg
South African people of Dutch descent
South African people of French descent
South African science fiction writers
South African television writers
South African women journalists
South African women short story writers
South African women novelists
Writers from Cape Town
White South African people
Women science fiction and fantasy writers
University of Cape Town alumni
Women mystery writers
Women television writers
21st-century screenwriters